The Very Best of Peter Andre: The Hits Collection is the first compilation album released by singer Peter Andre, containing hits from early in his career.

Track listing

Certifications

References

Peter Andre albums
2002 greatest hits albums